Pinocchio is a fictional, animated French character and singer, created by a music producer and DJ Bruno Berrebi.

He debuted in 2005 with a single titled "T'es pas cap Pinocchio", which reached number 2 in France, and followed with the singles "Pinocchio en hiver (Kalinka)", "Petit Papa Noël", "DJ Pinocchio", etc. during the years 2005–2007.

Discography

Albums

Singles

See also 
 Ilona Mitrecey
 Bébé Lilly
 Titou Le Lapinou

References 

  Classement du single T'es pas cap Pinocchio
  Classement du single Pinocchio en hiver (Kalinka)
  Classement du single Petit Papa Noël
  Classement du single DJ Pinocchio
  Classement du single Pinocchio le clown
  Classement du single L'oiseau électrique
  Classement du single Klick klack
  Classement du single Pinocchio in Moskau (Kalinka)
  Classement du single Lass uns lachen
  Classement du single Mon coeur fait boom boom
  Classement de l'album Mon Alboum !
  Classement de l'album Magic Pinocchio
  Classement de l'album Mein Album !

External links 
 
 Search for "Pinocchio" on the EMI Music channel

French children's musicians
Fictional singers
French singers
EMI Music France artists